McColleys Branch is a  long 2nd order tributary to Deep Creek in Sussex County, Delaware.  This is the only stream of this name in the United States.

Variant names
According to the Geographic Names Information System, it has also been known historically as:
McColley Branch
New Ditch

Course
McColleys Branch rises on the Horse Pound Swamp Ditch divide about 0.5 miles southwest of Bull Pine Corners, Delaware, and then flows northwesterly to join Deep Creek about 3 miles southeast of Coverdale Crossroads.

Watershed
McColleys Branch drains  of area, receives about 45.2 in/year of precipitation, has a wetness index of 708.10, and is about 22% forested.

See also
List of rivers of Delaware

References

Rivers of Delaware
Rivers of Sussex County, Delaware